Bengt Börjesson  (May 1, 1920 – August 1977) was a Swedish politician. He was a member of the Centre Party. He was a member of the Parliament of Sweden (lower chamber) 1961–1970, and of the unicameral parliament 1970–1977.

Members of the Riksdag from the Centre Party (Sweden)
1920 births
1977 deaths
Members of the Andra kammaren
20th-century Swedish politicians